Lehen may refer to:

 The German word for fief, especially in context of the feudalism in the Holy Roman Empire.

People
 Ľudo Lehen (1925–2014), Slovak artist, sculptor and author

Places

Germany
 , a village in the borough of Freiburg im Breisgau, Baden-Württemberg
 Lehen (Deggenhausertal), a village in the municipality of Deggenhausertal, Bodenseekreis, Baden-Württemberg
 Lehen (Lenzkirch), a village in the municipality of Lenzkirch, county of Breisgau-Hochschwarzwald, Baden-Württemberg
 Lehen (Winden im Elztal), a village in the municipality of Winden im Elztal, county of Emmendingen, Baden-Württemberg
 Lehen (Eschbronn), a village in the municipality of Eschbronn, county of Rottweil, Baden-Württemberg
 Lehen (Schramberg), a village in the municipality of Schramberg, county of Rottweil, Baden-Württemberg
 Lehen (Triberg in the Black Forest), a village in the municipality of Triberg in the Black Forest, Schwarzwald-Baar-county of, Baden-Württemberg
 Lehen (Todtmoos), a village in the municipality of Todtmoos, county of Waldshut, Baden-Württemberg
 Lehen (Schömberg), a village in the municipality of Schömberg, Zollernalbkreis, Baden-Württemberg
 Lehen (Amtzell), a village in the municipality of Amtzell, county of Ravensburg, Baden-Württemberg
 , A village in the municipality of Stuttgart, Baden-Württemberg
 Lehen (Feichten an der Alz), a village in the municipality of Feichten a.d.Alz, county of Altötting, Bavaria
 Lehen (Garching an der Alz), a village in the municipality of Garching an der Alz, county of Altötting, Bavaria
 Lehen (Gaißach), a village in the municipality of Gaißach, county of Bad Tölz-Wolfratshausen, Bavaria
 Lehen (Wackersberg), a village in the municipality of Wackersberg, county of Bad Tölz-Wolfratshausen, Bavaria
 Lehen (Weidenberg), a village in the municipality of Weidenberg, county of Bayreuth, Bavaria
 Lehen (Schöllnach), a village in the municipality of Schöllnach, county of Deggendorf, Bavaria
 Lehen (Loiching), a village in the municipality of Loiching, county of Dingolfing-Landau, Bavaria
 Lehen (Reisbach), a village in the municipality of Reisbach, county of Dingolfing-Landau, Bavaria
 Lehen (Simbach), a village in the municipality of Simbach, county of Dingolfing-Landau, Bavaria
 Lehen (Steinhöring), a village in the municipality of Steinhöring, county of Ebersberg, Bavaria
 Lehen (Sankt Wolfgang), a village in the municipality of Sankt Wolfgang, county of Erding, Bavaria
 Lehen (Taufkirchen (Vils)), a village in the municipality of Taufkirchen (Vils), county of Erding, Bavaria
 Lehen (Abensberg), a village in the municipality of Abensberg, county of Kelheim, Bavaria
 Lehen (Altfraunhofen), a village in the municipality of Altfraunhofen, county of Landshut, Bavaria
 Lehen (Hohenthann), a village in the municipality of Hohenthann, county of Landshut, Bavaria
 Lehen (Neufraunhofen), a village in the municipality of Neufraunhofen, county of Landshut, Bavaria
 Lehen (Niederaichbach), a village in the municipality of Niederaichbach, county of Landshut, Bavaria
 Lehen (Velden), a village in the municipality of Velden, county of Landshut, Bavaria
 Lehen (Wurmsham), a village in the municipality of Wurmsham, county of Landshut, Bavaria
 Lehen (Fischbachau), a village in the municipality of Fischbachau, county of Miesbach, Bavaria
 Lehen (Hausham), a village in the municipality of Hausham, county of Miesbach, Bavaria
 Lehen (Miesbach), a village in the municipality of Miesbach, county of Miesbach, Bavaria
 Lehen (Aicha vorm Wald), a village in the municipality of Aicha vorm Wald, county of Passau, Bavaria
 Lehen (Fürstenstein), a village in the municipality of Fürstenstein, county of Passau, Bavaria
 Lehen (Wolnzach), a village in the municipality of Wolnzach, county of Pfaffenhofen a.d.Ilm, Bavaria
 Lehen (Kollnburg), a village in the municipality of Kollnburg, county of Regen, Bavaria
 Lehen (Lindberg), a village in the municipality of Lindberg, county of Regen, Bavaria
 Lehen (Prackenbach), a village in the municipality of Prackenbach, county of Regen, Bavaria
 Lehen (Bernhardswald), a village in the municipality of Bernhardswald, county of Regensburg, Bavaria
 Lehen (Wenzenbach), a village in the municipality of Wenzenbach, county of Regensburg, Bavaria
 Lehen (Großkarolinenfeld), a village in the municipality of Großkarolinenfeld, county of Rosenheim, Bavaria
 Lehen (Pfaffing), a village in the municipality of Pfaffing, county of Rosenheim, Bavaria
 Lehen (Soyen), a village in the municipality of Soyen, county of Rosenheim, Bavaria
 Lehen (Falkenberg), a village in the municipality of Falkenberg, county of Rottal-Inn, Bavaria
 Lehen (Wittibreut), a village in the municipality of Wittibreut, county of Rottal-Inn, Bavaria
 Lehen (Zeilarn), a village in the municipality of Zeilarn, county of Rottal-Inn, Bavaria
 Lehen (Krummennaab), a village in the municipality of Krummennaab, county of Tirschenreuth, Bavaria
 Lehen (Petting), a village in the municipality of Petting, county of Traunstein, Bavaria
 Lehen (Tacherting), a village in the municipality of Tacherting, county of Traunstein, Bavaria
 Lehen (Bernbeuren), a village in the municipality of Bernbeuren, county of Weilheim-Schongau, Bavaria
 A village in the municipality of Ibbenbüren, county of Steinfurt, North Rhine-Westphalia
 A village in the municipality of Obergurig, county of Bautzen, Saxony

Austria
 Lehen (Bischofstetten), village in the municipality of Bischofstetten, district of Melk, Lower Austria
 Lehen (Leiben), cadastral municipality of Leiben in Lower Austria
 , cadastral municipality on the Melk in Lower Austria
 Lehen (Kirchberg), cadastral municipality of Kirchberg am Wechsel in Lower Austria
 Lehen (Mitterkirchen im Machland), a village in the municipality of Mitterkirchen, Upper Austria
 Lehen (Pühret), village in the municipality of Pühret, Upper Austria
 Lehen, Sankt Marienkirchen am Hausruck, see Sankt Marienkirchen am Hausruck
 Lehen (Annaberg-Lungötz), village near Annaberg-Lungötz, district of Hallein, Land Salzburg
 Lehen (Seekirchen), village near Seekirchen am Wallersee, district of Salzburg-Umgebung, Land Salzburg
 , suburb of Salzburg
 Lehen (Umhausen), hamlet in the parish of Niederthal, Umhausen, Tyrol
 Lehen (Telfs), village in Telfs, district of Innsbruck Land, Tyrol

Slovenia
 Lehen na Pohorju, settlement in the municipality of Podvelka

Other
Lehen Castle, Kochendorf, county of Heilbronn, Baden-Württemberg

See also 
 Lehner (disambiguation)